The 2015 Houston mayoral election was decided by a runoff that took place on December 12, 2015, to elect the Mayor of Houston, Texas. As no candidate won a majority of the vote during the general election on November 3, 2015, the run off was held between the top two finishers, Sylvester Turner, who received 31.31% of the vote, and Bill King, who received 25.27%.  In the run-off, Turner edged King, 51% to 49%, to become the 62nd Mayor of Houston.

Thirteen candidates appeared on the November ballot. A poll of likely voters conducted in June revealed that half of the city's likely voters were undecided, and that three of the candidates included in the poll, Sylvester Turner, Adrian Garcia and Chris Bell (all of whom were Democrats) were within the margin of error of the top two spots.  However, the final results were significantly different from the early polling, with Independent King claiming the second runoff spot along with Turner.

Mayoral elections in Houston are biennial, with the winner being sworn-in in the following January for a four-year term.  The election is officially nonpartisan, although the political parties still support and endorse candidates.

With the passage of voter-approved Proposition 2, the Mayor began a four-year term effective in January 2016.

Incumbent Mayor Annise Parker, a member of the Democratic Party who had been in office since 2010, was term-limited and could not run for re-election to a fourth term in office.

During the month between the general election and the runoff, Bell endorsed King, while Parker and Garcia, as well as then-U.S. President Barack Obama, endorsed Turner.

Candidates

Democratic Party

Declared
 Chris Bell, former U.S. Representative, former Houston City Council member, candidate for Mayor in 2001 and nominee for Governor of Texas in 2006
 Ben Hall, attorney, former Houston City Attorney and candidate for Mayor in 2013
 Sylvester Turner, State Representative and candidate for Mayor in 1991 and 2003
 Adrian Garcia, former Harris County Sheriff and former Houston City Councilmember
 Marty McVey, private equity executive
 Andrew Wood, ISA

Declined
 Clarence Bradford, Houston City Councilmember and former Chief of the Houston Police Department
 Chris Brown, Chief Deputy Houston City Controller (running for Controller)
 Bun B., rapper and political activist

Republican Party

Declared
 Stephen Costello, Houston City Councilmember

Withdrawn
 Oliver Pennington, Houston City Councilmember

Declined
 Jack Christie, Houston City Councilmember
 David Dewhurst, former Lieutenant Governor of Texas and candidate for the U.S. Senate in 2012
 Bill Frazer, candidate for Houston City Controller in 2013 (running for Controller)
 Michael Kubosh, Houston City Councilmember
 Laura Murillo, President and CEO of the Houston Hispanic Chamber of Commerce

Independent

Bill King, attorney and former Mayor of Kemah

Polling

General election 
Held November 3, 2015 -- 50% needed to avoid runoff

Held December 12, 2015

See also
Politics of Houston
Houston City Council

Notes

References

External links
Torn on the Bayou: What the chaotic mayor's race can tell us about Houston's future

Mayoral election, 2015
Houston mayoral
Houston
2015
Non-partisan elections